Escobecques is a commune in the Nord department in northern France. There are about 300 residents in this commune.

Heraldry

See also
Communes of the Nord department

References

Communes of Nord (French department)
French Flanders